Richter 10 is a 1996 science fiction novel by Arthur C. Clarke and Mike McQuay. The protagonist is Lewis Crane, who develops a hatred of earthquakes due to a major earthquake hitting his house when he is seven years old, killing his parents. The book's title is a reference to the Richter scale, on which 10 was considered (when the scale was devised) to be the most power an earthquake was likely to ever have.

The plot deals with predicting earthquakes months or years in advance, and eventually banishing them forever from earth by stopping all tectonic activity.

Plot summary

There are four defining episodes in the story, and a variety of subplots and minor threads — many of them unrelated to the main story. The story begins late in the 20th century, and tracks the life of the main protagonist, Lewis Crane. The first of four episodes opens the story. An earthquake in California in the late 20th century has left seven-year-old Lewis Crane a crippled, homeless orphan.

The second major episode shows Crane as an adult, world's foremost earthquake expert, a Nobel laureate, ruthless scientist, and entrepreneur dedicated to relieving the misery of those affected by earthquakes. He is also the moving force behind Foundation, an organization whose purpose is to further scientific research on earthquakes. Foundation has just perfected the technology to predict earthquakes to within minutes of due time, intensity, and geographical areas that will be affected. His first prediction is for Sado island in Japan—according to him, most of the island will be destroyed, as will the inhabited village of Aikawa.

Local authorities not only ignore his warnings, but vilify him. On the predicted day of the earthquake, Crane has collected a lot of media and relief organizations to cover the event. Many of them are on a small part of the island that will be safe, according to the prediction, while others are covering the event from the air. Directly before the predicted time, the mayor of Aikawa arrives with police to arrest and deport Crane as a fear-monger; at that moment, the earthquake hits. By the time the dust settles, Crane's predictions have come true.

The third major episode is set in the US. Crane's model has predicted that a major quake is to hit the areas around parts of the Mississippi river. A business politician cartel of disbelievers decides to use this prediction to further their interests in the presidential elections due soon. The cartel penetrates the Foundation, and tweaks their field data so the prediction is revealed to be a few months sooner. The cartel wins the elections, and Lewis loses credibility when the quake does not occur on the announced date.

A postmortem at Foundation uncovers the altered data, and the fact that the quake is still due in a few months. After much public relations work, a few people are willing to take precautions, but many are not listening, as the governmental authorities attempt to silence Crane and his Foundation. The quake hits as predicted, and Lewis emerges a hero and a prophet.

The fourth and final episode involves a bold plan to banish earthquakes from Earth forever by "spot welding" the plates forming earth's crust at about 50 strategic places, thus stopping their movement. This welding will be done by detonating powerful nuclear bombs deep inside the earth with energies directed downwards, with no impact on the surface.

There are two objections from naysayers; first, that the detonation of nuclear bombs is dangerous, and second, that there may be unforeseen consequences by stopping all Earth's tectonic activity. This is when another long-range earthquake prediction is made. A few decades hence, a Richter 10 quake will split much of California from the North American mainland, and make it an island in the Pacific, with massive losses of life and property. However, if the first of the 50 odd "spot welds" is done at a certain location in the Western US, and within a certain time window, this disaster can be averted.

Lewis convinces the powers that run the country of the event, and a secret project on the lines of Manhattan Project is conceived for the first "spot weld". Just before the nukes are to be triggered, a terrorist attack on the project destroys the facility; Lewis loses his wife and child in the attack. The book ends with Lewis's suicide by remaining in the quake zone when it finally hits.

Reception
Gideon Kibblewhite reviewed Richter 10 for Arcane magazine, rating it a 3 out of 10 overall. Kibblewhite comments that "The words 'well trodden' and 'ground' spring to mind. Yes. The characters are very poor, too. It will still be a blockbuster, though, even if the earth didn't move for me."

Reviews
Review by Gary K. Wolfe (1996) in Locus, #422 March 1996
Review by Stephen Baxter (1996) in Interzone, #106 April 1996
Review by Don D'Ammassa (1996) in Science Fiction Chronicle, #189 May/June 1996
Review by uncredited (1996) in The Magazine of Fantasy & Science Fiction, June 1996
Review by L. J. Hurst (1996) in Vector 188
Review by Andy Mills (1997) in Vector 192
Review [German] by Wolfgang Both (1999) in Alien Contact, Nummer 35

References

External links 
 

1996 British novels
1996 science fiction novels
Collaborative novels
Novels about orphans
Novels by Arthur C. Clarke
Victor Gollancz Ltd books
Works about earthquakes